Kuchlibari  is a village in the Mekhliganj CD block in the Mekhliganj subdivision of the Cooch Behar district  in the state of West Bengal, India.

Geography

Location

Area overview
The map alongside shows the western part of the district. In Mekhliganj subdivision 9.91% of the population lives in the urban areas and 90.09% lives in the rural areas. In Mathabhanga subdivision 3.67% of the population, the lowest in the district, lives in the urban areas and 96.35% lives in the rural areas. The entire district forms the flat alluvial flood plains of mighty rivers.

Note: The map alongside presents some of the notable locations in the subdivisions. All places marked in the map are linked in the larger full screen map.

Civic administration

Police station
Kuchlibari police station has jurisdiction over a part of Mekhliganj CD block. Kuchlibari police station covers an area of 41.17 sq km.

Demographics
As per the 2011 Census of India, Kuchlibari had a total population of 610.  There were 312 (51%) males and 298 (49%) females. There were 52 persons in the age range of 0 to 6 years. The total number of literate people in Kuchlibari was 469 (84.05% of the population over 6 years).

References

Villages in Cooch Behar district